Jin Qeshlaqi (also Romanized as Jīn Qeshlāqī; also known as Ḩasan Qeshlāq, Jenn Qeshlāqī, and Jīn Qeshlāq) is a village in Mehmandust Rural District, Kuraim District, Nir County, Ardabil Province, Iran. At the 2006 census, its population was 321, in 69 families.

References 

Towns and villages in Nir County